Hanne Blank, also known as Hanne Blank Boyd, is an American historian, writer, and editor. Her written works include Virgin: The Untouched History, Straight: The Surprisingly Short History of Heterosexuality, and The Unapologetic Fat Girl's Guide to Exercise and Other Incendiary Acts.

Biography 

Hanne Blank was born in Northampton, Massachusetts and grew up in the greater Cleveland, Ohio area, becoming a classically trained musician and then a formally educated historian. As a musician, she was a Fellow of the Boston University Tanglewood Institute and was the 1991 recipient of the George Whitefield Chadwick medal for work as a proponent of contemporary art music.

She began writing erotica at age 17, and published the zine Zaftig! while a doctoral student at Brandeis University. Her first book, Big Big Love: A Sourcebook for People of Size and Those Who Love Them, was published by Greenery Press. After writing and editing several books of erotic fiction, she became an editor of Scarletletters.com, a website featuring erotic writing for a female audience by female authors, and a related website Scarleteen, focused on sex education, which were both owned by Heather Corinna. In 2003, her book Unruly Appetites was published by Seal Press.

As an independent scholar, she was a 2004-2005 Scholar of the Institute For Teaching and Research on Women at Towson University, Maryland.

She is a former associate editor of Sojourner: The Women's Forum, and has also written sex columns for The Boston Phoenix and Good Vibes Magazine. As an instructor (prior to becoming a full-time writer/editor), she taught at the university level at Brandeis University, Tufts University and Whitworth College.

In 2012, she published Straight: The Surprisingly Short History of Heterosexuality, which begins with her own life experience and then explores a history of late 19th and early 20th century construction of the concept of sexuality. In 2012, she also published The Unapologetic Fat Girl’s Guide to Exercise and Other Incendiary Acts, and explained in an interview with Curve, "Moving your body for your own reasons, taking pleasure in moving your body, is incendiary for fat women because fat women's bodies aren't seen as deserving of that care, that attention, or that freedom to move and take up space in the world."

Selected works

Fiction 
 Zaftig: Well-Rounded Erotica. Cleis Press, 2001. 
 Shameless: Women's Intimate Erotica. Seal Press, 2002. 
 
 Unruly Appetites. Seal Press, 2003.

Non-fiction 
 Big, Big Love: A Sourcebook on Sex for People of Size and Those Who Love Them. Greenery Press, 2000.  
 Virgin: The Untouched History. Bloomsbury USA, 2007. 
 Straight: The Surprisingly Short History of Heterosexuality. Beacon, 2012. 
 
 "FAT" in Object Lessons  Bloomsbury, USA 2020, isbn 978 1-5013-3328-6

Critical reception

Big Big Love: A Sourcebook on Sex for People of Size and Those Who Love Them
In a 2001 review for the Journal of Sex Education and Therapy, Martha Cornog writes, "Blank starts out by debunking the cultural truism in America that sex and fat don't mix." The revised edition, published in 2011, was reviewed by Sheila Addison in Fat Studies.

Virgin: The Untouched History
In a 2007 review for The New York Times, Alex Kuczynski describes Virgin: The Untouched History as "quite a different animal" from Blank's past work as an erotica author and editor, and "A well-researched history of virginity, it veers from the medical (who knew there are five different types of hymens?) to the pop-cultural (discussions of "Beverly Hills 90210," the movie "Little Darlings" and so on) to the scholarly (dissections of Christian theology, 19th-century British social policy and the like)." A review from Publishers Weekly states, "Blank, an independent scholar, has pieced together a history of how humans have constructed the idea of virginity (almost always female and heterosexual) and engineered its uses to suit cultural and political forces."

In a review for the San Francisco Chronicle, Bob Blaisdell writes, "Though scholarly, Hanne Blank's "Virgin: The Untouched History" treats her topic with a writer's, not an academic's, interest. That is, she's curious about and surprised by what she discovers, and keeps the book moving along at a reader's pace." Ellen D. Gilbert writes for Library Journal it is "a very good book", but "The reader in search of a chronological or carefully delineated thematic approach to the subject will be disappointed." In a review for Booklist, Annie Tully writes, "This is also strictly a Western history, with modern-day "honor killings" not mentioned until the epilogue. [...] Perhaps Blank's next treatise will provide a needed further look at this complex and significant topic."

Straight: The Surprisingly Short History of Heterosexuality
In a 2011 review of Straight: The Surprisingly Short History of Heterosexuality, Kirkus Reviews writes, "In this chronicle of changing sexual mores, the author challenges the common preconception today that the distinction between homosexuality and heterosexuality is legitimate" and "The author uses wisdom and wit to substantiate her contention that love and passion are not definable by biology." A review from Publishers Weekly states, "From its thorough but brisk explorations of sexual orientation’s intersections with sex, gender, and romance, this illuminating study examines our presuppositions and makes a powerful, provocative argument that heterosexuality—mazy, unscientific, and new—may be merely "a particular configuration of sex and power in a particular historical moment.""

In a review for Library Journal, Jennifer Stout writes, "Adding to the expanding body of knowledge about the history and sociology of sexual identity, Blank has produced a challenging, clear, and interesting study of how Western views of what it means to be "straight" have changed over the past two centuries and continue to change." George de Stefano writes in a review for the New York Journal of Books that Blank's approach to the topic "will be familiar to anyone who has read Michel Foucault or any of his many intellectual progeny" and the book "is indebted to Jonathan Ned Katz, whom she cites, and if she adds little to Katz's account besides more recent references and a personal perspective on the topic, Straight nonetheless is accessible and engaging, often witty and penetrating in its insights."

Ryan Linkof writes for Journal of Social History, "A crucial aspect of her critique of heterosexuality stems from her clever undoing of the premise that heterosexuality must exist because it is necessary for reproduction." In The Baltimore Sun, Laura Dattaro writes, "Because heterosexuality is presumed "normal," it often escapes the sort of examination to which homosexuality is subjected", and "Blank calls the accepted state into question, and in doing so undermines its relevance." In a review for the Journal of Gay & Lesbian Mental Health, Sharon Scales Rostosky writes, "Blank reveals to us the doxa of heterosexuality, the socially constructed but invisible walls that threaten to keep us stuck in claustrophobic rooms that limit us intellectually, scientifically, socially, and politically."

The Unapologetic Fat Girl’s Guide to Exercise and Other Incendiary Acts
A 2012 review of The Unapologetic Fat Girl’s Guide to Exercise and Other Incendiary Acts by Publishers Weekly states, "In this empowering and informative book Blank contends that it's a fat woman’s birthright to move and enjoy her body."  Pauline Baughman writes in a review for Library Journal, "This unique guide is anything but a diet and exercise book."

Fat
In a 2020 review for Fat Studies, Jenna M. Wilson writes, "At once historical, personal, analytical, scientific, and humorous, Fat shifts seamlessly from concrete data [...] to scenes from Blank's bedroom, gym lockeroom, and high school bathroom. The tone of Fat is casual and ahem, digestible, while also providing a succinct and significant overview of fatness and some of the issues most relevant to the burgeoning field of fat studies."

See also 
 Body image
 Fat acceptance
Fat feminism
 Human sexuality
 Virginity

References

Further reading 

 One on One - with Hanne Blank, Pif Magazine, April 2000.
 The oy of sex, New Voices, 2002?
 20 Questions about Virginity: Scarleteen Interviews Hanne Blank, Scarleteen, 2005?

External links 
  
 Biography page from Hanne Blank's Website

American feminist writers
21st-century American historians
American women short story writers
American short story writers
American women's rights activists
Fat acceptance activists
Feminist studies scholars
Living people
Writers from Cleveland
Writers from Northampton, Massachusetts
American sex columnists
American women columnists
American sex educators
Activists from Ohio
Activists from Massachusetts
American people of Ukrainian descent
Towson University faculty
American women historians
Journalists from Ohio
Historians from Massachusetts
21st-century American women writers
Historians from Ohio
Year of birth missing (living people)